Mustapha Bakri is a member of the Egyptian House of Representatives. In 1996 he was serving as the editor-in-chief of Al Ahrar, organ of the Liberal Party, but fired due to his extensive support for the Nasserist views. He also served as the editor-in-chief of the El-Osboa newspaper.

References

20th-century journalists
21st-century Egyptian politicians
1956 births
Egyptian newspaper editors
Living people
Members of the House of Representatives (Egypt)
Assiut University alumni